Edge-ing is an album by American jazz saxophonist Oliver Lake recorded in 1993 for the Italian Black Saint label.

Reception
The Allmusic review awarded the album 4 stars.

Track listing
All compositions by Oliver Lake except as indicated
 "Edge-ing" - 9:08 
 "Scene One" - 8:42 
 "Shiffs" - 11:18 
 "Peanut Butter" (John Hicks) - 10:27 
 "Zaki" - 5:46 
 "Verve Nerve" (Curtis Clark) - 9:07 
Recorded at Mu Rec Studio in Milano, Italy on June 28 & 29, 1993

Personnel
Oliver Lake - alto saxophone
Charles Eubanks - piano
Reggie Workman - bass
Andrew Cyrille - drums

References

 

Black Saint/Soul Note albums
Oliver Lake albums
1993 albums